Cherserigone is a monotypic genus of North African dwarf spiders containing the single species, Cherserigone gracilipes. It was first described by J. Denis in 1954, and has only been found in Algeria.

See also
 List of Linyphiidae species

References

Linyphiidae
Monotypic Araneomorphae genera
Spiders of Africa